Wellington—Grey—Dufferin—Simcoe was a federal electoral district represented in the House of Commons of Canada from 1988 to 1997. It was located in the province of Ontario. This riding was created in 1987 from parts of Bruce—Grey, Grey—Simcoe and Wellington—Dufferin—Simcoe ridings.

The electoral district was abolished in 1996 when it was re-distributed between Dufferin—Peel—Wellington—Grey, Simcoe—Grey and Waterloo—Wellington ridings. 
 
Wellington—Grey—Dufferin—Simcoe consisted of the County of Dufferin; the Town of Thornbury, the Village of Dundalk and the townships of Collingwood, Egremont, Osprey and Proton in the County of Grey; the towns of Collingwood and Stayner, the Village of Creemore and the Township of Nottawasaga in the County of Simcoe; and the towns of Fergus, Harriston, Mount Forest and Palmerston, the villages of Arthur, Clifford and Elora, and the townships of Arthur, Minto, Nichol, West Garafraxa and West Luther in the County of Wellington.

Members of Parliament

This riding has elected the following Members of Parliament:

Election results

|-
  
|Liberal
|Murray Calder
|align="right"|20,374    
  
|Progressive Conservative
|Perrin Beatty
|align="right"| 18,665 

 
|New Democratic
|Dan Heffernan 
|align="right"| 2,090

|}

See also 

 List of Canadian federal electoral districts
 Past Canadian electoral districts

External links 

 Website of the Parliament of Canada

Former federal electoral districts of Ontario